

Honours
All-time honours list including semi-professional period.

Club

Domestic

Leagues
 Chinese Super League
Winners (7): 2011, 2012, 2013, 2014, 2015, 2016, 2017

 Chinese Jia-B League / China League One
Winners (5): 1956, 1958, 1981, 2007, 2010

Cups
 Chinese FA Cup
Winners (2): 2012, 2016

 Chinese FA Super Cup
Winners (4): 2012, 2016, 2017, 2018

International
 AFC Champions League
Winners (2): 2013, 2015

 FIFA Club World Cup
Fourth place (2): 2013, 2015

Personal

(* shared)

Player records

Appearances
Most appearances in the league: Feng Junyan, 222 games, 2003–14
Most appearances in all matches: Gao Lin, 304 games, 2010–present
Most first-tier league appearances: Gao Lin, 190 games, 2011–present

Goalscorers
Most goals in all competitions: Gao Lin, 100 goals, 2010–present
Most goals in first-tier league: Gao Lin, 62 goals, 2011–present
Most goals in a season: 34 goals, Elkeson in the 2014 season
Most goals in a match: 4 goals, Hu Zhijun against Shanghai Shenhua, 14 August 1994 and Muriqui against Nanjing Yoyo, 21 July 2010
Fastest goal: Tan Ende, 10 seconds, against Yanbian Hyundai, 2 June 1996

All-time top goalscorers
Since 1994 the first professional league season. Correct as of 28 August 2019. Names in bold indicate players currently plays for Guangzhou.

Transfers
Record transfer fee paid: signing Jackson Martínez from Atlético Madrid for €42 million, February 2016
Record transfer fee received: selling Paulinho to FC Barcelona for €40 million, August 2017

Club records

Since 1994 the first professional league season. Correct as of 4 November 2017.

Wins
Record home win: 10–0 against Nanjing Yoyo in China League One, 21 July 2010
Record away win: 6–0 against Shijiazhuang Ever Bright in Chinese Super League, 15 October 2016

Defeats
Record home defeat: 2–5 against Shanghai Shenhua in Jia-A League, 8 May 1994
Record away defeat: 0–6 against Changchun Yatai in Super League, 11 October 2008

Streaks
Longest unbeaten streak (league): 44 games (32 wins and 12 draws) during the 2010 League One to 2011 Super League seasons
Longest home unbeaten run (league): 44 games during 2015 Super League season to 2017 Super League season (29 wins and 15 draws)
Longest away unbeaten run (league): 23 games (14 wins and 9 draws) during the 2010 League One to 2011 Super League seasons
Longest streak without a win (league): 12 games (5 draws and 7 defeats) during the 2002 Jia-B League season
Longest streak without a win at home (league): 7 games (4 draws and 3 defeats) during the 1998 Jia-A League season
Longest streak without a win away (league): 21 games (11 draws and 10 defeats) during 1996 to 1998 Jia-A League seasons
Longest winning streak (league): 10 games during the 2017 Super League season
Longest home winning streak (league): 12 games during the 2011 to 2012 Super League season
Longest away winning streak (league): 10 games during the 2015 Super League season
Longest losing streak (league): 6 games during the 1998 Jia-A League season
Longest home losing streak (league): 3 games during the 1998 Jia-A League season
Longest away losing streak (league): 7 games during 1999 to 2000 Jia-B League seasons
Longest drawing streak (league): 6 games during the 2004 League One season
Longest home drawing streak (league): 3 games during the 2000 Jia-B League season, 2004 League One season, 2009 Super League season and 2015 Super League season
Longest away drawing streak (league): 4 games during 2000 to 2001 Jia-B League seasons
Longest scoring run (league): 23 games during the 2010 League One to 2011 Super League season
Longest scoring run at home (league): 36 games during 2010 League One to 2012 Super League season
Longest scoring run away (league): 11 games during the 2010 League One to 2011 Super League seasons and during 2013 Super League season
Longest non-scoring run (league): 6 games during the 1997 Jia-A League season
Longest non-scoring run at home (league): 3 games during the 1997 Jia-A League season and 1999 Jia-B League season
Longest non-scoring run away (league): 9 games during the 1997 Jia-A League season
Longest streak without conceding a goal (league): 4 games during 2001 to 2002 Jia-B League seasons and 2007 League One season
Longest streak without conceding a goal at home (league): 7 games during 2001 to 2002 Jia-B League seasons
Longest streak without conceding a goal away (league): 4 games during the 2010 League One season and 2011 Super League season
Longest streak with conceding goals (league): 9 games during 2001 to 2002 Jia-B League seasons and 2009 Super League season
Longest streak with conceding goals at home (league): 9 games during the 2006 League One season
Longest streak with conceding goals away (league): 14 games during 1999 to 2000 Jia-B League seasons

Record results in a season
Most wins in a league season: 24 – 2013 Super League seasons
Most draws in a league season: 16 – 2004 League One season
Most draws in a first-tier league season: 10 – 1997 Jia-A League season, 2008 Super League season and 2009 Super League season
Most defeats in a league season: 14 – 1998 Jia-A League season
Fewest wins in a league season: 4 – 1998 Jia-A League season and 2002 Jia-B League season
Fewest draws in a league season: 3 – 2006 League One season
Fewest draws in a first-tier league season: 5 – 1994 Jia-A League season and 2013 Super League season
Fewest defeats in a league season: 1 – 2007 League One season, 2010 League One season and 2013 Super League season
Fewest defeats in a first-tier league season: 1 – 2013 Super League season, 2015 Super League season

Goals
Most league goals scored in a season: 78 – 2013 Super League season
Fewest league goals scored in a season: 14 – 1997 Jia-A League season
Most league goals conceded in a season: 42 – 2008 Super League season
Fewest league goals conceded in a season: 15 – 2007 League One season
Fewest first-tier league goals conceded in a season: 18 – 2013 Super League season

Asian statistics

References

Guangzhou F.C.